Historic Camden Revolutionary War Site is a national historic district and open-air museum located in Camden, Kershaw County, South Carolina, United States.  Roughly 40 minutes away from Columbia, the state capitol, it is one of the state's largest tourist attractions. The 107-acre site is also known as Historic Camden Revolutionary War Restoration, and as the British Revolutionary War Fortifications. Camden contains preserved structures and grounds that are representative of the Southern theater of the American Revolutionary War. The site is managed by a consortium of private donors and local governments. The area is also an affiliated unit of the National Park Service.

History
Following the loss of Charleston, Camden was captured and served as the main British supply post from the spring of 1780 to the spring of 1781 during the American Revolutionary War, and served as their garrison for two major engagements, the Battle of Camden and Battle of Hobkirk's Hill. Camden was also strategic in maintaining Britain's control of South Carolina's back country. At the time, Camden consisted of two city blocks of period homes and military barracks surrounded by a palisade log fence, and further protected by five redoubt and three other fortified features (a house, a jail, and a powder magazine) which were placed strategically from 100 to 1000 feet outside the town itself.

The desire to control this territory was great for the British, as Camden was located on a crossroads of the routes to the largest Southern cities of Charleston, South Carolina and Savannah, Georgia. The location of the principal Battle of Camden is nine miles (14 km) north of the site, while several other skirmishes occurred within  of the town. Between the summers of 1780 and 1781, the British were able to claim victory in many of these assaults, but with high casualty rates. These costly struggles both weakened the Redcoats as a unit and spurred the momentum of an anti-war movement in the British Isles.

The site was listed on the National Register of Historic Places in 1969.

Camden is significant due to the role it played during the war. It was a direct result of England's attempt during late 1779 to attempt to gain control of all the southern colonies.

Museum

Included within the park are a variety of reconstructed and refurbished structures from the colonial-era town site. Many of the restored buildings contain Revolutionary War artifacts recovered from the site.

The museum has a Facebook page that provides visitors with updates, announcements, historical facts about the site, and photos and video of reenactments.

 Joseph Kershaw Mansion, a reconstructed and furnished house built in 1977, also known as the Kershaw-Cornwallis House. The original mansion was used as the British headquarters in the Carolinas by General Charles Cornwallis, during an eleven-month Redcoat occupation of the town.
 1785 John Craven House, restored and furnished
 1830 Cunningham House, which houses the tour office and gift shop
 Two log houses built around 1800 now house exhibits about the war and the Colonial era: Bradley house and Craven House.
 A moat that had existed during the Revolution was also rebuilt on the grounds.
 Throughout the park are reconstructed multiple military fortifications to represent what they would have looked like during the time of the Revolution. 
 A blacksmith exhibit provides live action tutorials on classic colonial forms of blacksmithing.

Activities, events and reenactments
Each year during the first weekend in November, Camden hosts its most popular event, "Revolutionary War Field Days". The reenactments held throughout the weekend depict military operations of both British and American forces. They are widely popular, and hundreds of re-enactors gather from more than 20 states every year. The Camden reenactments are some of the oldest Revolutionary War reenactments in the United States. The events are historically accurate and accompanied by live commentary.

Throughout the weekend the re-enactors remain in character, and visitors are encouraged to walk through the camps. The guests are greeted with a historically accurate depiction of the 18th-century battleground.  They may experience blacksmithing, campfire cooking, and live dance demonstrations.

The museum also offers various guided and unguided tours along with a .7-mile nature trail and picnic area.

Historic Camden also allows people to volunteer at the site. Camden is mainly funded by charitable donations and small local government funding, so volunteers are key to maintaining it and its facilities.

References

External links
 Historic Camden Revolutionary War Site
 Historic Camden Revolutionary War Site listing in the National Register of Historic Places

Museums in Kershaw County, South Carolina
Historic districts on the National Register of Historic Places in South Carolina
Camden, South Carolina
Buildings and structures in Kershaw County, South Carolina
National Register of Historic Places in Kershaw County, South Carolina
National Historic Sites in South Carolina
National Historic Landmarks in South Carolina
South Carolina in the American Revolution
1780 in the United States
Protected areas of Kershaw County, South Carolina
Open-air museums in South Carolina
American Revolutionary War museums in South Carolina
Parks in South Carolina
American Revolution on the National Register of Historic Places